The Jacket is a 2001 children's book by author Andrew Clements. It was first published in 2001 as a serialized story that ran in the Boston Globe and was later published in book format on August 1, 2003 through Atheneum Books. The work centers upon a young boy that discovers that although he doesn't identify as racist or discriminatory, he does have deep-seated and unconscious prejudices that prompt him to immediately suspect the worst about a black student at his school.

Clements based the book's premise around a similar situation that occurred in his life, where his brother mistakenly believed that an African-American boy had stolen his jacket and confronted him over the theft. Since its release, the book has been utilized in classrooms as a way to illustrate different types of racism.

Synopsis
Schoolboy Phil has never viewed himself as racist, but he's forced to rethink his stance when he accuses Daniel of stealing an imported jacket. Daniel, who is African-American, was given the jacket as a gift by his grandmother, who works for Phil's mother as a housekeeper and had received the jacket as a hand-me-down. Phil immediately begins to rethink his actions, wondering if he would have treated the situation differently if Daniel had been white instead of black. Tortured by self-doubt, Phil looks at his immediate surroundings and is saddened when he realizes that he has likely been influenced by his father, who is openly bigoted.

Reception
Critical reception was mostly positive. Publishers Weekly praised The Jacket, commenting that while the book lacked subtlety, it "pointedly delivers a timely message and can serve as a springboard for dialogue about tolerance and self-honesty.

References

External links
 

American children's novels
Novels about race and ethnicity
2001 American novels
Novels first published in serial form
The Boston Globe
2001 children's books